In mathematics, Eisenstein's criterion gives a sufficient condition for a polynomial with integer coefficients to be irreducible over the rational numbers – that is, for it to not be factorizable into the product of non-constant polynomials with rational coefficients.

This criterion is not applicable to all polynomials with integer coefficients that are irreducible over the rational numbers, but it does allow in certain important cases for irreducibility to be proved with very little effort. It may apply either directly or after transformation of the original polynomial.

This criterion is named after Gotthold Eisenstein. In the early 20th century, it was also known as the Schönemann–Eisenstein theorem because Theodor Schönemann was the first to publish it.

Criterion

Suppose we have the following polynomial with integer coefficients.

 

If there exists a prime number  such that the following three conditions all apply:

 does not divide , and
 does not divide ,

then  is irreducible over the rational numbers. The latter possibility can be avoided by first making  primitive, by dividing it by the greatest common divisor of its coefficients (the content of ).

Examples

Eisenstein's criterion may apply either directly (i.e., using the original polynomial) or after transformation of the original polynomial.

Direct (without transformation)

Consider the polynomial . Note that since  is of degree 4, this conclusion could not have been established by only checking that  has no rational roots (which eliminates possible factors of degree 1), since a decomposition into two quadratic factors could also be possible.

Indirect (after transformation)

Often Eisenstein's criterion does not apply for any prime number. The fact that the polynomial after substitution is irreducible then allows concluding that the original polynomial is as well. This procedure is known as applying a shift.

Since the substitution is an automorphism of the ring , the fact that we obtain an irreducible polynomial after substitution implies that we had an irreducible polynomial originally. In this particular example it would have been simpler to argue that  (being monic of degree 2) could only be reducible if it had an integer root, which it obviously does not; however the general principle of trying substitutions in order to make Eisenstein's criterion apply is a useful way to broaden its scope.

Another possibility to transform a polynomial so as to satisfy the criterion, which may be combined with applying a shift, is reversing the order of its coefficients, provided its constant term is nonzero (without which it would be divisible by  anyway).

Cyclotomic polynomials 

An important class of polynomials whose irreducibility can be established using Eisenstein's criterion is that of the cyclotomic polynomials for prime numbers . Such a polynomial is obtained by dividing the polynomial  by the linear factor , corresponding to its obvious root  (which is its only rational root if ):

An alternative way to arrive at this conclusion is to use the identity  which is valid in characteristic  (and which is based on the same properties of binomial coefficients, and gives rise to the Frobenius endomorphism), to compute the reduction modulo  of the quotient of polynomials:

History

Theodor Schönemann was the first to publish a version of the criterion, in 1846 in Crelle's Journal, which reads in translation

That  will be irreducible to the modulus  when  to the modulus  does not contain a factor .

As stated it is not entirely correct in that it makes no assumptions on the degree of the polynomial , so that the polynomial considered need not be of the degree  that its expression suggests; the example , shows the conclusion is not valid without such hypothesis. Assuming that the degree of  does not exceed , the criterion is correct however, and somewhat stronger than the formulation given above, since if  is irreducible modulo , it certainly cannot decompose in  into non-constant factors.

Subsequently Eisenstein published a somewhat different version in 1850, also in Crelle's Journal. This version reads in translation

Here "whole real numbers" are ordinary integers and "whole complex numbers" are Gaussian integers; one should similarly interpret "real and complex prime numbers". The application for which Eisenstein developed his criterion was establishing the irreducibility of certain polynomials with coefficients in the Gaussian integers that arise in the study of the division of the lemniscate into pieces of equal arc-length.

Remarkably Schönemann and Eisenstein, once having formulated their respective criteria for irreducibility, both immediately apply it to give an elementary proof of the irreducibility of the cyclotomic polynomials for prime numbers, a result that Gauss had obtained in his Disquisitiones Arithmeticae with a much more complicated proof. In fact, Eisenstein adds in a footnote that the only proof for this irreducibility known to him, other than that of Gauss, is one given by Kronecker in 1845. This shows that he was unaware of the two different proofs of this statement that Schönemann had given in his 1846 article, where the second proof was based on the above-mentioned criterion. This is all the more surprising given the fact that two pages further, Eisenstein actually refers (for a different matter) to the first part of Schönemann's article. In a note ("Notiz") that appeared in the following issue of the Journal, Schönemann points this out to Eisenstein, and indicates that the latter's method is not essentially different from the one he used in the second proof.

Basic proof

But by hypothesis this reduction for  leaves its leading term, of the form  for a non-zero constant , as the only nonzero term.

A second proof of Eisenstein's criterion also starts with the assumption that the polynomial  is reducible. It is shown that this assumption entails a contradiction.

The assumption that 

 

is reducible means that there are polynomials 

Such that

One may without loss of generality proceed 

By the assumption,  does not divide .

 

Since

Advanced explanation

Applying the theory of the Newton polygon for the -adic number field, for an Eisenstein polynomial, we are supposed to take the lower convex envelope of the points

,

This tells us that each root of  has -adic valuation  and hence that  is irreducible over the -adic field (since, for instance, no product of any proper subset of the roots has integer valuation); and a fortiori over the rational number field.

This argument is much more complicated than the direct argument by reduction mod .

In fact only primes  ramifying in the extension of  generated by a root of  have any chance of working. For example, in the case  given above, the discriminant is  so that  is the only prime that has a chance of making it satisfy the criterion. Therefore the variable shift is actually something predictable.

Again, for the cyclotomic polynomial, it becomes

;

the discriminant can be shown to be (up to sign) , by linear algebra methods.

More precisely, only totally ramified primes have a chance of being Eisenstein primes for the polynomial.

Generalization

Generalized criterion

Given an integral domain , let

Suppose there exists a prime ideal  of  such that

  for each ,
 , and

Proof

The proof of this generalization is similar to the one for the original statement, considering the reduction of the coefficients modulo ; the essential point is that a single-term polynomial over the integral domain  cannot decompose as a product in which at least one of the factors has more than one term (because in such a product there can be no cancellation in the coefficient either of the highest or the lowest possible degree).

Example

After , one of the basic examples of an integral domain is the polynomial ring  in the variable  over the field .

See also

Cohn's irreducibility criterion
Perron's irreducibility criterion

Notes

References

.

.

.

.

.
.

.

Polynomials
Field (mathematics)
Articles containing proofs